The Lee Hwa Chung theorem is a theorem in symplectic topology.

The statement is as follows. Let M be a symplectic manifold with symplectic form ω. Let  be a differential k-form on M which is invariant for all Hamiltonian vector fields. Then:

If k is odd, 

If k is even, where

References
 Lee, John M., Introduction to Smooth Manifolds, Springer-Verlag, New York (2003) . Graduate-level textbook on smooth manifolds.
 Hwa-Chung, Lee, "The Universal Integral Invariants of Hamiltonian Systems and Application to the Theory of Canonical Transformations", Proceedings of the Royal Society of Edinburgh. Section A. Mathematical and Physical Sciences, 62(03), 237–246. doi:10.1017/s0080454100006646 
Symplectic topology
Theorems in differential geometry